Night of the Quarter Moon is a 1959 American drama film directed by Hugo Haas and written by Franklin Coen and Frank Davis. The film stars Julie London, John Drew Barrymore, Anna Kashfi, Dean Jones, Agnes Moorehead and Nat King Cole. The film was released on March 4, 1959, by Metro-Goldwyn-Mayer.

Plot
A young man returns home with a new bride, but his family objects when they learn she is of mixed race.

Cast
Julie London as Ginny O'Sullivan Nelson
John Drew Barrymore as Roderic "Chuck" Nelson
Anna Kashfi as Maria Robbin 
Dean Jones as Lexington Nelson
Agnes Moorehead as Cornelia Nelson
Nat King Cole as Cy Robbin
Ray Anthony as The Hotel Manager
Jackie Coogan as Desk Sergeant Bragan
Charles Chaplin, Jr. as Young Thug
Billy Daniels as Headwaiter
Cathy Crosby as Singer
James Edwards as Asa Tully
Arthur Shields as Captain Tom O'Sullivan
Edward Andrews as Clinton Page
Robert Warwick as Judge 
Marguerite Belafonte as Hostess

Production
The film was based on an original story by Frank Davis and Franklin Coen. Albert Zugsmith, who had a producing deal with MGM, bought it in September 1957. Zugsmith gave lead roles to John Drew Barrymore, who had been in the producer's High School Confidential, and Julie London.

Reception

Box Office
According to MGM records the movie earned $465,000 in the US and Canada and $475,000 elsewhere, making a loss to the studio of $146,000.

Critical
It was described by Mae Tinee in a Chicago Tribune review as, "one of the most inept films I've ever encountered [...] contrived and insulting to the intelligence [...] completely tasteless [...] sordid, sexy and senseless [...] contrived and ridiculous [...] a sheer waste of time."

Awards
Anna Kashfi won the Best Supporting Actress Award at the Cartagena Film Festival in 1961.

See also
 List of American films of 1959

References

External links
 
 

1959 films
Metro-Goldwyn-Mayer films
1950s English-language films
1959 romantic drama films
American romantic drama films
Films directed by Hugo Haas
Films scored by Albert Glasser
Films about interracial romance
Films about race and ethnicity
1950s American films